The Camopi is a  long river in French Guiana. It rises in the south of the country, flowing northeast until it reaches the river Oyapock at the town of Camopi, on the border with Brazil.

References

Rivers of French Guiana
Rivers of France